Events during the year 1102 in Italy.

Deaths
 Antipope Theodoric
 Antipope Adalbert
 Henry, Count of Monte Sant'Angelo
 Vital I Michele
 Pope Michael IV of Alexandria

Sources
Chalandon, Ferdinand. Histoire de la domination normande en Italie et en Sicile. Paris, 1907.
Caravale, Mario (ed). Dizionario Biografico degli Italiani LXII Dugoni – Enza. Rome, 1993.
Jahn, W. Unersuchungen zur normannischen Herrschaftsbildung in Süditalien (1040–1100). Phil. Diss. Munich, 1988.

Years of the 12th century in Italy
Italy
Italy